Compsoctena terrestris is a moth in the family Eriocottidae. It was described by Edward Meyrick in 1914. It is found in South Africa, where it has been recorded from Gauteng.

The wingspan is 16–18 mm for males and 22–23 mm for females. The forewings are fuscous somewhat sprinkled with whitish fuscous, and with dark fuscous scales tending to form very obscure scattered strigulae. The hindwings are rather dark fuscous.

References

Endemic moths of South Africa
Moths described in 1914
Compsoctena
Lepidoptera of South Africa